Jon Jay Greiner (born July 6, 1951) is an American politician and former police chief from Utah. A Republican, he was a member of the Utah State Senate, representing the state's 18th senate district in Davis, and Weber Counties including the city of Ogden.

Greiner is a graduate of both Weber State University and Utah State University.  He has also served on the Board of Trustees of Weber State University.

On December 28, 2011 Greiner was fired as Ogden City Police Chief. City officials commented, "Greiner’s termination was unwanted and involuntary on the part of the city, but was required by the Federal Merit Systems Protection Board, pursuant to the Hatch Act."

References 

Living people
Weber State University alumni
Utah State University alumni
Republican Party Utah state senators
American municipal police chiefs
1951 births
21st-century American politicians